Pierre Clovis François Joseph Claussat (October 12, 1874 – November 9, 1925) was a French politician. He served as the mayor of Châteldon from 1908 until his death in 1925. He also served as a member of the Chamber of Deputies from 1911 to 1925, representing Puy-de-Dôme.

He was born to Joseph Claussat (1846-1910) and Élisabeth Dassaud. He had seven siblings three of whom were: Jean (1872-1916), an infantry commander who died of wounds in Verdun during World War I, Marie "Marguerite" (the mother of painter Josette Bournet) and Élisabeth Eugénie Marie Marguerite Jeanne "Jeanne" (1888-1959) (the wife of politician Pierre Laval and mother of Josée Laval). His father, also a Socialist, had served as mayor of Châteldon from 1881 to 1891.

He married (Jeanne) Marguerite Sacouman (1883-1925) on August 14, 1913. They didn't have children. He died suddenly of a cerebral hemorrhage while on a hunting trip on November 9, 1925 at La Ferté-Vidame near Chartres, at the age of 51. His wife committed suicide three days later.

References

1874 births
1925 deaths
People from Puy-de-Dôme
Politicians from Auvergne-Rhône-Alpes
French Section of the Workers' International politicians
Members of the 10th Chamber of Deputies of the French Third Republic
Members of the 11th Chamber of Deputies of the French Third Republic
Members of the 12th Chamber of Deputies of the French Third Republic
Members of the 13th Chamber of Deputies of the French Third Republic
Mayors of places in Auvergne-Rhône-Alpes